Velosnes is a commune in the Meuse department in Grand Est in north-eastern France.

Geography
The river Othain forms part of the commune's southern border; the Chiers forms all of its northern border.

See also
Communes of the Meuse department

References

Communes of Meuse (department)